Kettering is a coastal town on the D'Entrecasteaux Channel (37 km south of Hobart) opposite Bruny Island, Tasmania, Australia.   At the 2011 census, Kettering had a population of 984.

History
The area was explored by Bruni D'Entrecasteaux in 1792 and was settled in the early 19th century by timber cutters, whalers and sealers. Life was hard and the people who lived in the area rarely settled for long preferring the life in Hobart Town to the whaling stations and logging camps.

It was just north of Kettering in Oyster Cove that the last Tasmanian Aboriginal settlement was established in 1847. Aborigines from all over Van Diemen's Land had been rounded up some years earlier and isolated on Flinders Island. In 1847 the remnants, now only 44 people, were taken to a reserve at Oyster Cove. By 1855 there were only 16 people left and by 1869 only Truganini remained. She died in 1876 but it was not until 1976 that her ashes were thrown to the winds on the D'Entrecasteaux Channel.

Little Oyster Cove Post Office opened on 19 October 1868 and was renamed Kettering in 1892.

Geography and environment
The Kettering region, although sheltered by Bruny Island is increasingly subject to foreshore erosion, communities in some areas have decided to sandbag sections of coast to reduce the effects.

Today
Today the area is noted for its orchards (apples, cherries, pears) and Kettering has become an important service centre for the local farmers. Like so much of the area south of Hobart, both towns have become centres for commuters and alternative lifestyle dwellers who find the peacefulness suits them.

These tiny settlements are now the focus of marine activities. 
Kettering is the centre for fishing in the region. It has two major marinas, South Haven Marina and Oyster Cove Marina, as well as many smaller, privately owned jetties. Approximately 400 boats are located in Kettering whether on moorings or in marinas. 
The Bruny Island Ferry, Mirambeena, runs from Kettering numerous times a day.

Kettering has a thriving community involved in many artistic pursuits. There are many artists and crafts people living in Kettering and the Southern Channel. 2008 saw a local production of Under Milk Wood, presented as a radio play in the local Community Hall which was very successful. It also was at the centre of the 2008 Art Trail an event which included 3 exhibitions and 9 artists' studios opened to the public.  The success
of the initial experiment led to the 2010 Art Trail. The local Kettering Music Group have been organising 4 or 5 chamber music concerts a year, now known as the Kettering Concerts and a Jazz in July concert since 2004. The next 
Art Trail is planned for August 2012. In July/August 2016, Kettering was the filming location of the 15 million dollar TV series, The Kettering Incident, which aired on Foxtel and BBC.

At the 2016 Australian federal election the Kettering booth recorded a 32% Liberal vote, 31% Labor vote and 27% Greens vote, with the remainder going to the Arts and Christian Democratic parties.

Features and services
 General supplies and petrol are available at Kettering Central.
 The Oyster Cove Inn is a mansion built in the 1930s.  A major refurbishment undertaken in 2009  has restored it to its original glory. The Inn sits at the head of Little Oyster Cove and has superb views over Oyster Cove Marina to the bay and Bruny Island.
 The Kettering Oval is used throughout the summer mainly for Cricket but also for events such as The Taste of the Huon which showcases some of the Channel and Huon Valley's finest food and wine.
 Kettering has a Post Office owned by Australia Post and run locally by Rose and Mike Larner as part of the Kettering Central Complex. This consists of the Kettering LPO, General Store and take away, DVD hire, UNITED fuel and gas, local Butcher and  The Cove hair salon.
 Kettering has two cafés, the Mermaid Café situated next to the Bruny Island Ferry Terminal and Pasha's located halfway along Ferry Road specialising in Turkish cuisine. The Oyster Cove Inn has a restaurant and also offers bar meals.  Excellent coffee and light snacks are available at Coffee a Go Go located next to the service station on the Channel Highway.
 Speciality hand-made chocolates are available from John Zito's Nutpatch which is also located adjacent to the service station.
 Kettering has a well-appointed Community Hall. In 2004 acoustic panelling was installed making the space suitable for meetings, concerts, theatre and exhibitions. It has a badminton court and local enthusiasts play weekly.

References

External links

Art Trail
Music concerts
Jazz concert

Towns in Tasmania
Southern Tasmania
Localities of Kingborough Council